Mark Iehielvich Freidkin (April 14, 1953 – March 4, 2014) was a Russian poet, author, translator, and singer.

Biography 
Freidkin was born on April 14, 1953 in Leninobod (now Khujand, Tajikistan) and studied in the Moscow English School No. 9. He has translated poetry from both English (including Ben Jonson, Robert Burns, Thomas Hardy, Ezra Pound, Roald Dahl, and Edward Lear) and French (including Stéphane Mallarmé, Alfred Jarry, Raymond Roussel, and Georges Brassens). He was director of the "Carte Blanche" publishing house, which in the 1990s released several well-known books, including a collection of the works of Olga Sedakova. He was the director and owner of Moscow's first privately owned bookstore, "October 19th".

Creative Work 

Freidkin has published three books of prose. In the past several decades, he has put to music poems written by himself as well as others; he has also worked on translating into Russian the songs of Georges Brassens. Freidkin performs his songs with the band "Goy", most of whose members, like him, studied at some point in the English school in North Moscow. He has performed several times in Germany, the US, France, and Israel.

Books of Prose (In Russian)
 «Главы из книги жизни» (Moscow, 1990)
 «Опыты» (Moscow, 1994)
 «Записки брачного афериста»
 «Из воспоминаний еврея-грузчика»
 «Больничные арабески»
 «Эскиз генеалогического древа»
 «Книга ни о чем»
 «Песни» (Moscow, 2003)
 «Каша из топора» (Moscow, 2009)
 «Искусство первого паса»
 «Ex epistolis»
 «История болезни, или Больничные арабески двадцать лет спустя»
 «О Венедикте Ерофеевe»

Translated Works 
 Х.Лофтинг «История доктора Дулитла» (Moscow, 1992)
 Э.Лир «Книга бессмыслиц» (Moscow, 1992; Kharkiv, 2008)
 Х.Беллок «Избранные назидательные стихотворения» (Moscow, 1994)
 Ж.Брассенс «Избранные песни» (Moscow, 1996)
 «Английская абсурдная поэзия» (Moscow, 1998; Saint Petersburg, 2007)
 Р.Даль «Детские бестселлеры» (Moscow, 2002)

Albums 
 «Эта собачья жизнь» (1997)
 «Песни Ж. Брассенса и запоздалые романсы» (1997)
 «Меж еще и уже» (2000)
 «Последние песни» (2002)
 «Король мудаков» (2005)
 «Блюз для дочурки» (2010)

Songs Performed by Others 
 «Тонкий шрам на любимой попе» (2003) — Freidkin's songs performed by Andrey Makarevich, Maxim Leonidov, Evgeny Margulis, Tatiana Lasareva, Alyona Sviridova, and the Creole Tango Orchestra.

References

External links
 Official website
 Article on bards.ru
 Mark Freidkin on vekperevoda.com
 Page on vavilon.ru
 Freidkin’s television show “Plagiarism in Soviet Song” (video)

1953 births
2014 deaths
Singers from Moscow
Russian-language singers
Soviet Jews
Russian Jews
Russian male poets
Soviet poets
Soviet male writers
20th-century Russian male writers
Soviet translators
20th-century translators
20th-century Russian Jews